Calliostoma titanium is a species of sea snail, a marine gastropod mollusk in the family Calliostomatidae.

Description
The size of the shell varies between 25 mm and 35 mm.

Distribution
This species occurs in the Pacific Ocean off Santa Catalina Island and Cortez Bank, California, USA

References

External links
 To World Register of Marine Species
 

titanium
Gastropods described in 1984